In mathematics, the polylogarithm (also known as Jonquière's function, for Alfred Jonquière) is a special function  of order  and argument . Only for special values of  does the polylogarithm reduce to an elementary function such as the natural logarithm or a rational function. In quantum statistics, the polylogarithm function appears as the closed form of integrals of the Fermi–Dirac distribution and the Bose–Einstein distribution, and is also known as the Fermi–Dirac integral or the Bose–Einstein integral. In quantum electrodynamics, polylogarithms of positive integer order arise in the calculation of processes represented by higher-order Feynman diagrams.

The polylogarithm function is equivalent to the Hurwitz zeta function — either function can be expressed in terms of the other — and both functions are special cases of the Lerch transcendent. Polylogarithms should not be confused with polylogarithmic functions nor with the offset logarithmic integral which has the same notation, but with one variable.

(Here the denominator  is understood as ). The name of the function comes from the fact that it may also be defined as the repeated integral of itself:

thus the dilogarithm is an integral of a function involving the logarithm, and so on. For nonpositive integer orders , the polylogarithm is a rational function.

Properties
It is often convenient to define  where  is the principal branch of the complex logarithm  so that  Also, all exponentiation will be assumed to be single-valued: 

Depending on the order , the polylogarithm may be multi-valued. The discontinuity of the polylogarithm in dependence on  can sometimes be confusing.

Going across the cut, if ε is an infinitesimally small positive real number, then:

Both can be concluded from the series expansion (see below) of Lis(eµ) about 

The derivatives of the polylogarithm follow from the defining power series:

The square relationship is seen from the series definition, and is related to the duplication formula (see also):

Kummer's function obeys a very similar duplication formula. This is a special case of the multiplication formula, for any positive integer p:

which can be proved using the series definition of the polylogarithm and the orthogonality of the exponential terms (see e.g. discrete Fourier transform).

Another important property, the inversion formula, involves the Hurwitz zeta function or the Bernoulli polynomials and is found under relationship to other functions below.

Particular values

For particular cases, the polylogarithm may be expressed in terms of other functions (see below). Particular values for the polylogarithm may thus also be found as particular values of these other functions.

For integer values of the polylogarithm order, the following explicit expressions are obtained by repeated application of z·∂/∂z to Li1(z):

Accordingly the polylogarithm reduces to a ratio of polynomials in z, and is therefore a rational function of z, for all nonpositive integer orders. The general case may be expressed as a finite sum:

where S(n,k) are the Stirling numbers of the second kind. Equivalent formulae applicable to negative integer orders are :

and:

where  are the Eulerian numbers. All roots of Li−n(z) are distinct and real; they include z = 0, while the remainder is negative and centered about z = −1 on a logarithmic scale. As n becomes large, the numerical evaluation of these rational expressions increasingly suffers from cancellation ; full accuracy can be obtained, however, by computing Li−n(z) via the general relation with the Hurwitz zeta function (see below).
Some particular expressions for half-integer values of the argument z are:

where ζ is the Riemann zeta function. No formulae of this type are known for higher integer orders , but one has for instance :

which involves the alternating double sum 

In general one has for integer orders n ≥ 2 :

where ζ(s1, …, sk) is the multiple zeta function; for example:
As a straightforward consequence of the series definition, values of the polylogarithm at the pth complex roots of unity are given by the Fourier sum:

where ζ is the Hurwitz zeta function. For Re(s) > 1, where Lis(1) is finite, the relation also holds with m = 0 or m = p. While this formula is not as simple as that implied by the more general relation with the Hurwitz zeta function listed under relationship to other functions below, it has the advantage of applying to non-negative integer values of s as well. As usual, the relation may be inverted to express ζ(s, m⁄p) for any m = 1, …, p as a Fourier sum of Lis(exp(2πi k⁄p)) over k = 1, …, p.

Relationship to other functions

 For z = 1, the polylogarithm reduces to the Riemann zeta function 
 The polylogarithm is related to Dirichlet eta function and the Dirichlet beta function:  where η(s) is the Dirichlet eta function. For pure imaginary arguments, we have:  where β(s) is the Dirichlet beta function.
 The polylogarithm is related to the complete Fermi–Dirac integral as: 
 The polylogarithm is a special case of the incomplete polylogarithm function 
 The polylogarithm is a special case of the Lerch transcendent  
 The polylogarithm is related to the Hurwitz zeta function by:

which relation, however, is invalidated at positive integer s by poles of the gamma function Γ(1 − s), and at s = 0 by a pole of both zeta functions; a derivation of this formula is given under series representations below. With a little help from a functional equation for the Hurwitz zeta function, the polylogarithm is consequently also related to that function via :

which relation holds for 0 ≤ Re(x) < 1 if Im(x) ≥ 0, and for 0 < Re(x) ≤ 1 if Im(x) < 0. Equivalently, for all complex s and for complex z ∉ ]0;1], the inversion formula reads

and for all complex s and for complex z ∉ ]1;∞[

For z ∉ ]0;∞[, one has ln(−z) = −ln(−1⁄z), and both expressions agree. These relations furnish the analytic continuation of the polylogarithm beyond the circle of convergence |z| = 1 of the defining power series. See the next item for a simplified formula when s is an integer.
 For positive integer polylogarithm orders s, the Hurwitz zeta function ζ(1−s, x) reduces to Bernoulli polynomials, ζ(1−n, x) = −Bn(x) / n, and Jonquière's inversion formula for n = 1, 2, 3, … becomes:

where again 0 ≤ Re(x) < 1 if Im(x) ≥ 0, and 0 < Re(x) ≤ 1 if Im(x) < 0. Upon restriction of the polylogarithm argument to the unit circle, Im(x) = 0, the left hand side of this formula simplifies to 2 Re(Lin(e2πix)) if n is even, and to 2i Im(Lin(e2πix)) if n is odd. For negative integer orders, on the other hand, the divergence of Γ(s) implies for all z that :

More generally, one has for :

where both expressions agree for z ∉ ]0;∞[.
 The polylogarithm with pure imaginary μ may be expressed in terms of the Clausen functions Cis(θ) and Sis(θ), and vice versa:

 The inverse tangent integral Tis(z)  can be expressed in terms of polylogarithms:

The relation in particular implies:

which explains the function name.
 The Legendre chi function χs(z) can be expressed in terms of polylogarithms:

 The polylogarithm of integer order can be expressed as a generalized hypergeometric function:

 In terms of the incomplete zeta functions or "Debye functions" :

the polylogarithm Lin(z) for positive integer n may be expressed as the finite sum :

A remarkably similar expression relates the "Debye functions" Zn(z) to the polylogarithm:

 Using Lambert series, if  is Jordan's totient function, then

Integral representations
Any of the following integral representations furnishes the analytic continuation of the polylogarithm beyond the circle of convergence |z| = 1 of the defining power series.
The polylogarithm can be expressed in terms of the integral of the Bose–Einstein distribution:

This converges for Re(s) > 0 and all z except for z real and ≥ 1. The polylogarithm in this context is sometimes referred to as a Bose integral but more commonly as a Bose–Einstein integral.Bose integral is result of multiplication between Gamma function and Zeta function.

One can begin with equation for Bose integral, then use series equation.

Secondly, regroup expressions. Similarly, the polylogarithm can be expressed in terms of the integral of the Fermi–Dirac distribution:

This converges for Re(s) > 0 and all z except for z real and ≤ −1. The polylogarithm in this context is sometimes referred to as a Fermi integral or a Fermi–Dirac integral . These representations are readily verified by Taylor expansion of the integrand with respect to z and termwise integration. The papers of Dingle contain detailed investigations of both types of integrals.

The polylogarithm is also related to the integral of the Maxwell–Boltzmann distribution:

This also gives the asymptotic behavior of polylogarithm at the vicinity of origin.
A complementary integral representation applies to Re(s) < 0 and to all z except to z real and ≥ 0:

This integral follows from the general relation of the polylogarithm with the Hurwitz zeta function (see above) and a familiar integral representation of the latter.
The polylogarithm may be quite generally represented by a Hankel contour integral , which extends the Bose–Einstein representation to negative orders s. As long as the t = μ pole of the integrand does not lie on the non-negative real axis, and s ≠ 1, 2, 3, …, we have:

where H represents the Hankel contour. The integrand has a cut along the real axis from zero to infinity, with the axis belonging to the lower half plane of t. The integration starts at +∞ on the upper half plane (Im(t) > 0), circles the origin without enclosing any of the poles t = µ + 2kπi, and terminates at +∞ on the lower half plane (Im(t) < 0). For the case where µ is real and non-negative, we can simply subtract the contribution of the enclosed t = µ pole:

where R is the residue of the pole:
When the Abel–Plana formula is applied to the defining series of the polylogarithm, a Hermite-type integral representation results that is valid for all complex z and for all complex s:

where Γ is the upper incomplete gamma-function. All (but not part) of the ln(z) in this expression can be replaced by −ln(1⁄z). A related representation which also holds for all complex s,

avoids the use of the incomplete gamma function, but this integral fails for z on the positive real axis if Re(s) ≤ 0. This expression is found by writing 2s Lis(−z) / (−z) = Φ(z2, s, 1⁄2) − z Φ(z2, s, 1), where Φ is the Lerch transcendent, and applying the Abel–Plana formula to the first Φ series and a complementary formula that involves 1 / (e2πt + 1) in place of 1 / (e2πt − 1) to the second Φ series.

Series representations
As noted under integral representations above, the Bose–Einstein integral representation of the polylogarithm may be extended to negative orders s by means of Hankel contour integration:

where H is the Hankel contour, s ≠ 1, 2, 3, …, and the t = μ pole of the integrand does not lie on the non-negative real axis. The contour can be modified so that it encloses the poles of the integrand at t − µ = 2kπi, and the integral can be evaluated as the sum of the residues:

This will hold for Re(s) < 0 and all μ except where eμ = 1. For 0 < Im(µ) ≤ 2π the sum can be split as:

where the two series can now be identified with the Hurwitz zeta function:

In order to represent the polylogarithm as a power series about µ = 0, we write the series derived from the Hankel contour integral as:

When the binomial powers in the sum are expanded about µ = 0 and the order of summation is reversed, the sum over h can be expressed in closed form:

This result holds for |µ| < 2π and, thanks to the analytic continuation provided by the zeta functions, for all s ≠ 1, 2, 3, … . If the order is a positive integer, s = n, both the term with k = n − 1 and the gamma function become infinite, although their sum does not. One obtains:

where the sum over h vanishes if k = 0. So, for positive integer orders and for |μ| < 2π we have the series:

where Hn denotes the nth harmonic number:

The problem terms now contain −ln(−μ) which, when multiplied by μn−1, will tend to zero as μ → 0, except for n = 1. This reflects the fact that Lis(z) exhibits a true logarithmic singularity at s = 1 and z = 1 since:

For s close, but not equal, to a positive integer, the divergent terms in the expansion about µ = 0 can be expected to cause computational difficulties . Erdélyi's corresponding expansion  in powers of ln(z) is not correct if one assumes that the principal branches of the polylogarithm and the logarithm are used simultaneously, since ln(1⁄z) is not uniformly equal to −ln(z).

For nonpositive integer values of s, the zeta function ζ(s − k) in the expansion about µ = 0 reduces to Bernoulli numbers: ζ(−n − k) = −B1+n+k / (1 + n + k). Numerical evaluation of Li−n(z) by this series does not suffer from the cancellation effects that the finite rational expressions given under particular values above exhibit for large n.
By use of the identity

the Bose–Einstein integral representation of the polylogarithm (see above) may be cast in the form:

Replacing the hyperbolic cotangent with a bilateral series,

then reversing the order of integral and sum, and finally identifying the summands with an integral representation of the upper incomplete gamma function, one obtains:

For both the bilateral series of this result and that for the hyperbolic cotangent, symmetric partial sums from −kmax to kmax converge unconditionally as kmax → ∞. Provided the summation is performed symmetrically, this series for Lis(z) thus holds for all complex s as well as all complex z.
Introducing an explicit expression for the Stirling numbers of the second kind into the finite sum for the polylogarithm of nonpositive integer order (see above) one may write:

The infinite series obtained by simply extending the outer summation to ∞ :

turns out to converge to the polylogarithm for all complex s and for complex z with Re(z) < 1⁄2, as can be verified for |−z⁄(1−z)| < 1⁄2 by reversing the order of summation and using:

The inner coefficients of these series can be expressed by Stirling-number-related formulas involving the generalized harmonic numbers. For example, see generating function transformations to find proofs (references to proofs) of the following identities:

For the other arguments with Re(z) < 1⁄2 the result follows by analytic continuation. This procedure is equivalent to applying Euler's transformation to the series in z that defines the polylogarithm.

Asymptotic expansions
For |z| ≫ 1, the polylogarithm can be expanded into asymptotic series in terms of ln(−z):

where B2k are the Bernoulli numbers. Both versions hold for all s and for any arg(z). As usual, the summation should be terminated when the terms start growing in magnitude. For negative integer s, the expansions vanish entirely; for non-negative integer s, they break off after a finite number of terms.  describes a method for obtaining these series from the Bose–Einstein integral representation (his equation 11.2 for Lis(eµ) requires −2π < Im(µ) ≤ 0).

Limiting behavior

The following limits result from the various representations of the polylogarithm :

Wood's first limit for Re(µ) → ∞ has been corrected in accordance with his equation 11.3. The limit for Re(s) → −∞ follows from the general relation of the polylogarithm with the Hurwitz zeta function (see above).

Dilogarithm

The dilogarithm is the polylogarithm of order s = 2. An alternate integral expression of the dilogarithm for arbitrary complex argument z is :

A source of confusion is that some computer algebra systems define the dilogarithm as dilog(z) = Li2(1−z).

In the case of real z ≥ 1 the first integral expression for the dilogarithm can be written as

from which expanding ln(t−1) and integrating term by term we obtain

The Abel identity for the dilogarithm is given by 

This is immediately seen to hold for either x = 0 or y = 0, and for general arguments is then easily verified by differentiation ∂/∂x ∂/∂y. For y = 1−x the identity reduces to Euler's reflection formula

where Li2(1) = ζ(2) = 1⁄6 π2 has been used and x may take any complex value.

In terms of the new variables u = x/(1−y), v = y/(1−x) the Abel identity reads

From the Abel identity for x = y = 1−z and the square relationship we have Landen's identity

and applying the reflection formula to each dilogarithm we find the inversion formula

and for real z ≥ 1 also

Known closed-form evaluations of the dilogarithm at special arguments are collected in the table below. Arguments in the first column are related by reflection x ↔ 1−x or inversion x ↔ 1⁄x to either x = 0 or x = −1; arguments in the third column are all interrelated by these operations.

 discusses the 17th to 19th century references. The reflection formula was already published by Landen in 1760, prior to its appearance in a 1768 book by Euler ; an equivalent to Abel's identity was already published by Spence in 1809, before Abel wrote his manuscript in 1826 . The designation bilogarithmische Function was introduced by Carl Johan Danielsson Hill (professor in Lund, Sweden) in 1828 .  has remarked that the dilogarithm is the only mathematical function possessing a sense of humor.

{| class="wikitable" style="text-align: center;"
|+ Special values of the dilogarithm
|-
! 
! 
! 
! 
|-
| 
| 
| 
| 
|-
| 
| 
| 
| 
|-
| 
| 
| 
| 
|-
| 
| 
| 
| 
|-
| 
| 
| 
| 
|-
| 
| 
| 
| 
|-
|}
Here  denotes the golden ratio.

Polylogarithm ladders

Leonard Lewin discovered a remarkable and broad generalization of a number of classical relationships on the polylogarithm for special values. These are now called polylogarithm ladders. Define  as the reciprocal of the golden ratio. Then two simple examples of dilogarithm ladders are

given by Landen. Polylogarithm ladders occur naturally and deeply in K-theory and algebraic geometry. Polylogarithm ladders provide the basis for the rapid computations of various mathematical constants by means of the BBP algorithm .

Monodromy
The polylogarithm has two branch points; one at z = 1 and another at z = 0. The second branch point, at z = 0, is not visible on the main sheet of the polylogarithm; it becomes visible only when the function is analytically continued to its other sheets. The monodromy group for the polylogarithm consists of the homotopy classes of loops that wind around the two branch points. Denoting these two by m0 and m1, the monodromy group has the group presentation

For the special case of the dilogarithm, one also has that wm0 = m0w, and the monodromy group becomes the Heisenberg group (identifying m0, m1 and w with x, y, z) .

References

  (this 1826 manuscript was only published posthumously.)
 
 
 
 
 
 
 
 
 
 
 
 
 
 
  (this is a reprint of the McGraw–Hill original of 1953.)
 
 
 
 
 
 
 
 
 
 
 
 
 
 
 
 
  (see § 1.2, "The generalized zeta function, Bernoulli polynomials, Euler polynomials, and polylogarithms", p. 23.)
 
 
 
 
 
  (this edition has been reprinted many times, a 1996 paperback has .)
 
 

External links
 
 
 Algorithms in Analytic Number Theory provides an arbitrary-precision, GMP-based, GPL-licensed implementation.

Special functions
Zeta and L-functions
Rational functions